Our Place was a short-lived Australian weekly live variety lifestyle programme broadcast on the Nine Network during early 2005.

Overview
Hosts Scott Cam and Cherie Hausler were joined by experts, which included unrelated Simone Maher and Jackie Adams-Maher for pets, Myles Baldwin for gardening, Dr John Tickell for health, Maggie Beer for food and Tara Dennis for home makeovers.

After 17 years on Australian television Don Burke's Burke's Backyard was cancelled at the end of 2004 and left the all important Friday evening 7:30 to 8:30 p.m. time slot, which led into Nine's Friday Night Football, open. After much hype and anticipation Our Place hit the screens on 8 April 2005 (delayed by two weeks due to the broadcast of the Pope John Paul II's funeral).

Cancellation
However, after just five episodes, Our Place was cancelled due to poor ratings and broadcast its final show on Friday 27 May 2005. The time slot has since been occupied by reality shows such as Motorway Patrol and Survivor: Guatemala. Channel 9 tried to revive the series to air during the non-ratings summer season, but there were no takers.

See also

List of Australian television series
List of programs broadcast by Nine Network

References

2005 Australian television series debuts
2005 Australian television series endings
Australian live television series
Australian variety television shows
Nine Network original programming
English-language television shows